Melrose is a hamlet of the Town of Schaghticoke, in Rensselaer County, New York, located approximately five miles north of Troy, and about six miles east of Mechanicville. It is about 30 minutes from Albany, 20 minutes from Clifton Park, and 10 minutes from Troy. The community is centered on State Route 40.

The Auclair–Button Farmstead and Cartin–Snyder–Overacker Farmstead were listed on the National Register of Historic Places in 2013.

Melrose is still the hometown of Mel Miller, creator of the Melrose Cheer,  Gimme a M, Gimme an E.... Mel is a wonderful man and local character who provided entertainment for the community for many years.

References

Hamlets in New York (state)
Hamlets in Rensselaer County, New York